Richard Forbes Russell (5 April 1879 – 30 May 1960) was a rugby union forward who played 122 times for Leicester Tigers between 1903 and 1913 scoring 28 tries, 26 conversions and 7 penalties for 157 points.  Russell made his Leicester debut against Devonport Albion on 19 September 1903 and quickly established himself in the side playing 29 times that season.  Russell was a try scorer as Tigers won the Midlands Counties Cup in 1904 and also played in the 1905 cup winning side, during the 1904/05 season Russell was the club's top scorer with 57 points.  Russell captained the club in the 1906/7 and 1907/8 seasons before his work as a school teacher took him to Cork.  Russell played a further, his final, game for Tigers in 1913.

Russell made his international debut for England on 2 December 1905 in England's first international against New Zealand at Crystal Palace. It was his only cap for England.

Sources
Farmer,Stuart & Hands, David Tigers-Official History of Leicester Football Club (The Rugby DevelopmentFoundation )

References

1879 births
1960 deaths
English rugby union players
England international rugby union players
Leicester Tigers players
Rugby union players from Nottinghamshire
Rugby union forwards